An infinite-dimensional vector function is a function whose values lie in an infinite-dimensional topological vector space, such as a Hilbert space or a Banach space.

Such functions are applied in most sciences including physics.

Example

Set  for every positive integer  and every real number  Then the function  defined by the formula

takes values that lie in the infinite-dimensional vector space  (or ) of real-valued sequences. For example,

Furthermore, the argument  could lie in any set instead of the set of real numbers.

Integral and derivative

Most theorems on integration and differentiation of scalar functions can be generalized to vector-valued functions, often using essentially the same proofs. Perhaps the most important exception is that absolutely continuous functions need not equal the integrals of their (a.e.) derivatives (unless, for example,  is a Hilbert space); see Radon–Nikodym theorem

A curve is a continuous map of the unit interval (or more generally, of a non−degenerate closed interval of real numbers) into a topological space. An arc is a curve that is also a topological embedding. A curve valued in a Hausdorff space is an arc if and only if it is injective.

Derivatives

If  where  is a Banach space or another topological vector space then the derivative of  can be defined in the usual way:

Functions with values in a Hilbert space

Most results of the finite-dimensional case also hold in the infinite-dimensional case too, with some modifications. Differentiation can also be defined to functions of several variables (for example,  or even  where  is an infinite-dimensional vector space).

If  is a Hilbert space then any derivative (and any other limit) can be computed componentwise: if

(that is,  where  is an orthonormal basis of the space ), and  exists, then

However, the existence of a componentwise derivative does not guarantee the existence of a derivative, as componentwise convergence in a Hilbert space does not guarantee convergence with respect to the actual topology of the Hilbert space.

Most of the above hold for other topological vector spaces  too. However, not as many classical results hold in the Banach space setting, for example, an absolutely continuous function with values in a suitable Banach space need not have a derivative anywhere. Moreover, in most Banach spaces setting there are no orthonormal bases.

Crinkled arcs

If  is another interval in its domain then the two chords are said to be non−overlapping chords if  and  have at most one end−point in common. 
Intuitively, two non−overlapping chords of a curve valued in an inner product space are orthogonal vectors if the curve makes a right angle turn somewhere along its path between its starting point and its ending point. 
If every pair of non−overlapping chords are orthogonal then such a right turn happens at every point of the curve; such a curve can not be differentiable at any point. 
A crinkled arc is an injective continuous curve with the property that any two non−overlapping chords are orthogonal vectors. 
An example of a crinkled arc in the Hilbert  space  is:

where  is the indicator function defined by

A crinkled arc can be found in every infinite−dimensional Hilbert space because any such space contains a closed vector subspace that is isomorphic to  
A crinkled arc  is said to be normalized if   and the span of its image  is a dense subset of 

If  is an increasing homeomorphism then  is called a reparameterization of the curve  

Measurability

The measurability of  can be defined by a number of ways, most important of which are Bochner measurability and weak measurability.

Integrals

Both these integrals commute with linear functionals. Also  spaces have been defined for such functions.

See also

References

 Einar Hille & Ralph Phillips: "Functional Analysis and Semi Groups", Amer. Math. Soc. Colloq. Publ. Vol. 31, Providence, R.I., 1957.
  

Banach spaces
Differential calculus
Hilbert space
Topological vector spaces
Vectors (mathematics and physics)